Shanta Jean Persaud is a diabetes researcher and academic. She is professor of diabetes and endocrinology at King's College London, England.

Career 
Persaud obtained a BSc degree in physiology and pharmacology and a PhD in the area of islets of langerhans. She started working at King's College London in 1989. Her current research focuses in the area of islet β-cells, receptors in islet function, and insulin secretagogues. According to Scopus, she has published over 198 scientific research documents with 5677 citations, and has an h-index of 45.

Selected publications 

 Faria, Alyssa; Persaud, Shanta J (2017). "Cardiac oxidative stress in diabetes: Mechanisms and therapeutic potential". Pharmacology & Therapeutics. 172: 50–62.
 Atanes P., Ruz-Maldonado I., Olaniru O.E., Persaud S.J. (2020). "Assessing Mouse Islet Function". In: King A. (eds) Animal Models of Diabetes. Methods in Molecular Biology, vol 2128. Humana, New York, NY.
 Altaf Al-Romaiyan, Bo Liu, Shanta Persaud, Peter Jones (2020). "A novel Gymnema sylvestre extract protects pancreatic beta-cells from cytokine-induced apoptosis". PHYTOTHERAPY RESEARCH. 34, 1, p. 161-172.

References 

Year of birth missing (living people)
Living people
Alumni of King's College London
Academics of King's College London
British diabetologists
British endocrinologists
Women endocrinologists
British nutritionists
British people of Indian descent